These are the results of the Junior Men's Pair event at the 2010 Summer Youth Olympics.

Medalists

Schedule
All times are China Standard Time (UTC+8)

Results

Heats
Qualification Rules: 1-3->SA/B, 4..->R

Heat 1
August 15, 12:00

Heat 2
August 15, 12:10

Heat 3
August 15, 12:20

Repechage
Qualification Rules: 1-3->SA/B, 4..->out
August 16, 12:05

Semifinals A/B
Qualification Rules: 1-3->FA, 4..->FB

Semifinal A/B 1
August 17, 11:45

Semifinal A/B 2
August 17, 11:55

Finals

Final B
August 18, 11:10

Final A
August 18, 12:00

References
 Results Page

Rowing at the 2010 Summer Youth Olympics